Daniela Wallen Morillo (born 4 April 1995) is a Venezuelan basketball player for Keflavík of the Úrvalsdeild kvenna and the Venezuela national team. She played college basketball for Northwest Florida State College and Oklahoma City University and won the NAIA championship with the later in 2017. Following her college career, she has played professionally in three continents. In 2018, she won the Paraguayan League championship with Sol de América Asunción and the following year she won the Finnish championship as a member of Peli-Karhut.

Early life
Wallen grew up in Venezuela where she played football in her youth. Her parents where both former basketball players, but she only started playing basketball with a youth team at the age of 15 and the same year she first played for one of Venezuela's youth national teams.

College career
Wallen started her college career with Independence Community College in 2013. After having trouble adjusting to the new settings, mostly due to the language barrier as she spoke no English, Wallen transferred to Northwest Florida State College the following season. During the 2014–2015 season, she was named First-team All-Panhandle Conference after averaging 15.4 points, 8.6 rebounds and 3.79 steals per game. In 2015, she transferred again, this time to Oklahoma City University. During her first year, she averaged 19.6 points, 9.3 rebounds, 3.2 assists and 3.3 steals per game and was named the Sooner Athletic Conference player of the year. The following season, she helped Oklahoma to win the NAIA championship while being named the Tournament MVP.

Club career
Wallen's first professional stop was with IK Eos in the Basketligan dam during the 2017–2018 season where she averaged 16.4 points and 11.8 rebounds per game. In March 2018, she signed with the Geelong Supercats of the Australian SEABL. After the SEABL season, she signed with Sol de América Asunción where she won the Paraguayan League championship with Sol de América Asunción and was named the Finals MVP in December the same year.

In February 2019, Wallen joined Peli-Karhut of the Finnish Naisten Korisliiga. In April, she won the Finnish championship after Peli beat Catz Lappeenranta in the Finals. In 2019, Wallen signed with Keflavík of the Icelandic Úrvalsdeild kvenna. She averaged 24.7 points, 13.1 rebounds and 4.9 assists during the 2019–20 season with Keflavík in the third place when the rest of the season was canceled due to the coronavirus pandemic in Iceland. She re-signed with Keflavík and had a stand-out second season, averaging 25.6 points and league leading 17.0 rebounds per game and was named the Úrvalsdeild Foreign Player of the Year.

References

External links
Northwest Florida State College Bio
Icelandic statistics at Icelandic Basketball Association
Swedish statistics at Basketligan dam
Finnish statistics at Korisliiga
Profile at Eurobasket.com
Oklahoma City Stars Bio

1995 births
Living people
Basketball players at the 2019 Pan American Games
Pan American Games 3x3 basketball players
Expatriate basketball people in Iceland
Daniela Wallen
Oklahoma City Stars women's basketball players
Pan American Games competitors for Venezuela
Daniela Wallen
Venezuelan expatriate basketball people
Venezuelan women's basketball players